The 2018 Fast5 Netball World Series was the ninth staging of the annual Fast5 Netball World Series, and the sixth to be played under the new Fast5 rules, which replaced the older fastnet rules introduced in 2009. The tournament was held in Australia for the third time at Melbourne Arena in Melbourne, Victoria.

The tournament was contested by the same six teams that competed last year.

Overview

Format
18 matches are played over two days, under the Fast5 rules of netball. Each team plays each other once during the first two days in a round-robin format. The two highest-scoring teams from this stage progress to the Grand Final while the remaining teams contest the third-fourth place playoff match and fifth-sixth place playoff match.

Teams
The tournament is contested by the six top national netball teams in the world, according to the INF World Rankings:

Fixtures

Round-robin

Finals

Final Placings

|

References
Official Link

2018
2018 in netball
International netball competitions hosted by Australia
2018 in Australian netball
2018 in New Zealand netball
2018 in English netball
2018 in South African women's sport
2018 in Malawian sport
2018 in Jamaican sport
October 2018 sports events in Australia
Netball in Victoria (Australia)